Baron Sherfield, of Sherfield-on-Loddon in the County of Southampton, Is a title in the Peerage of the United Kingdom.  It was created in 1964 for the diplomat Sir Roger Makins.  He had previously served as British Ambassador to the United States. His eldest son, the second Baron, was a leading expert on national security and defence issues.   the title is held by the latter's younger brother, the third Baron, who succeeded in 2006.

Sir Ernest Makins, father of the first baron, was a brigadier-general in the army and Member of Parliament for Knutsford.  Another member of the Makins family was the politician Sir William Makins, 1st Baronet.  He was the elder brother of Henry Thomas Makins, grandfather of the first Baron Sherfield.

Barons Sherfield (1964)

  Roger Mellor Makins, 1st Baron Sherfield (1904–1996)
  Christopher James Makins, 2nd Baron Sherfield (1942–2006)
  Dwight William Makins, 3rd Baron Sherfield (b. 1951)

There is no heir to the barony.

See also
 Makins Baronets, of Rotherfield Court

Notes

References
 Kidd, Charles, Williamson, David (editors). Debrett's Peerage and Baronetage (1990 edition). New York: St Martin's Press, 1990, 
 

Baronies in the Peerage of the United Kingdom
Noble titles created in 1964